Peggy Dow (born Peggy Josephine Varnadow; March 18, 1928) is an American philanthropist and retired actress who had a brief career in Hollywood at Universal Studios starring in films during the Golden Age Era in the early 1950s. She is perhaps best known for her roles as Nurse Kelly in Harvey (1950) and Judy Greene in Bright Victory (1951).

Early life
Born in Columbia, Mississippi, at age 4 she moved with her family to Covington, Louisiana. She attended high school and junior college at Gulf Park College in Gulfport, Mississippi (now the Gulf Park campus of the University of Southern Mississippi), then finished college at Northwestern University in Illinois, appearing in college plays and receiving her degree from Northwestern's School of Speech in 1948.

Career
After brief modeling and radio experience, Dow was spotted by a talent agent and cast in a television show in February 1949. Shortly after that exposure, Universal offered her a seven-year contract. Dow made nine films, most notably as Nurse Kelly in Harvey (1950), starring James Stewart, and co-starring with Best Actor Oscar nominee Arthur Kennedy in Bright Victory (1951). After being featured in several crime dramas, Dow had starring roles in two 1951 family films, Reunion in Reno and You Never Can Tell.

Dow retired after three years in the business to marry Walter Helmerich III, an oil driller from Tulsa, Oklahoma, in 1951. He became president of his family's business, Helmerich & Payne. They were married for 60 years, until his death in 2012. The couple had five sons. She became an active supporter of libraries and other charities.

The Peggy V. Helmerich Distinguished Author Award, an award given annually since 1985 to a distinguished author by the Tulsa Library Trust, is named in her honor, as is the drama school at the University of Oklahoma and the auditorium at Northwestern's Annie May Swift Hall.

Filmography
Your Show Time (TV anthology series) (1949)
Undertow (1949)
Woman in Hiding (1950)
Shakedown (1950)
The Sleeping City (1950)
Harvey (1950)
Bright Victory (1951)
You Never Can Tell (1951)
Reunion in Reno (1951)
I Want You (1951)
 The Cases of Eddie Drake (TV series) (1952)

See also

References

External links

Voices of Oklahoma interview with Peggy Dow Helmerich. First person interview conducted with Peggy Dow Helmerich. Original audio and transcript archived with Voices of Oklahoma oral history project.
 Peggy Dow at the American Film Institute
Peggy Dow on the cover of Life magazine; August 7 1950 issue

1928 births
Living people
20th-century American actresses
Actresses from Louisiana
Actresses from Mississippi
Actresses from Tulsa, Oklahoma
American film actresses
American philanthropists
Northwestern University School of Communication alumni
People from Columbia, Mississippi
People from Covington, Louisiana